Herobear and the Kid is a monthly comic book.  It won the Eisner Award for "Best Title for Younger Readers/Best Comics Publication for a Younger Audience" in both 2002 and 2003. Volume One consisted of six issues which were then collected in one softcover volume as well as a limited edition hardcover volume.

A second series, Herobear and the Kid: Saving Time, was published in 2014 to positive reviews.

Plot summary
Tyler's life is changed when he inherits a toy bear and a broken pocket watch.

See also
Alternative comics

References

http://comicsalliance.com/herobear-and-the-kid-saving-time-1-shows-how-all-ages-comics-are-done-review/

Eisner Award winners